Colombia competed at the 2014 Summer Youth Olympics, in Nanjing, China from 16 August to 28 August 2014.

Medalists

Athletics

Colombia qualified 11 athletes.

Qualification Legend: Q=Final A (medal); qB=Final B (non-medal); qC=Final C (non-medal); qD=Final D (non-medal); qE=Final E (non-medal)

Boys
Track & road events

Field Events

Girls
Track & road events

Field events

Cycling

Colombia qualified a boys' and girls' team based on its ranking issued by the UCI.

Team

Mixed Relay

Diving

Colombia qualified four quotas based on its performance at the Nanjing 2014 Diving Qualifying Event.

Gymnastics

Artistic Gymnastics

Colombia qualified two athletes based on its performance at the 2014 Junior Pan American Artistic Gymnastics Championships.

Boys

Girls

Judo

Colombia qualified two athletes based on its performance at the 2013 Cadet World Judo Championships.

Individual

Team

Shooting

Colombia was given a wild card to compete.

Individual

Team

Swimming

Colombia qualified one swimmer.

Boys

Taekwondo

Colombia qualified two athletes based on its performance at the Taekwondo Qualification Tournament.

Boys

Girls

Tennis

Colombia qualified two athletes based on the 9 June 2014 ITF World Junior Rankings.

Singles

Doubles

Triathlon

Colombia qualified two athletes based on its performance at the 2014 American Youth Olympic Games Qualifier.

Individual

Relay

Weightlifting

Colombia qualified 1 quota in the boys' events and 1 quota in the girls' events based on the team ranking after the 2013 Weightlifting Youth World Championships.

Boys

Girls

Wrestling

Colombia qualified three athletes based on its performance at the 2014 Pan American Cadet Championships.

Boys

Girls

References

2014 in Colombian sport
Nations at the 2014 Summer Youth Olympics
Colombia at the Youth Olympics